Dziećmorowice  is a village in the administrative district of Gmina Walim, within Wałbrzych County, Lower Silesian Voivodeship, in south-western Poland.

References

Villages in Wałbrzych County